The Rome and Clinton Railroad was a railroad connecting Rome, New York with Clinton, New York.  It was built by Willis Phelps & Company in 1871, initially as a coal route and leased by the New York and Oswego Midland Railroad as a branch line in connection with the Utica, Clinton and Binghamton Railroad.  After a few years under the Delaware and Hudson Company, it returned to the New York, Ontario and Western Railway system in 1886.  This branch line was nicknamed "The Peanut", and was abandoned in 1932.

References 

Defunct New York (state) railroads
Predecessors of the New York, Ontario and Western Railway
Railway companies established in 1869
Railway companies disestablished in 1944
Transportation in Rome, New York
1944 disestablishments in New York (state)
1869 establishments in New York (state)